Ashop may refer to:
 River Ashop, a river in the Peak District, Derbyshire, East Midlands of England
 Upper Ashop, a habitation in Derbyshire, England (see Hope Woodlands)